Martina García (born June 27, 1981) is a Colombian model, film and television actress best known for her roles as Maritza in the second season of the Netflix crime drama Narcos (2016), and in the Spanish-Colombian movie The Hidden Face (La cara oculta), as well as a role in the third season of Homeland (2013).

Filmography
 1999: La guerra de las rosas (TV series)
 2002: María madrugada (TV series)
 2003: Amor a la plancha (TV series)
 2004: Perder es cuestión de método
 2004: La Saga, Negocio de Familia (TV series)
 2007: Satanás
 2007: Pura sangre (TV series)
 2007: Mujeres asesinas (TV series)
 2008: Tiempo final (TV series)
 2008: Plan América (TV series, all episodes)
 2009: Amar a morir
 2009: Rage
 2009: Día naranja
 2010: No eres tú, soy yo
 2010: La mosquitera
 2011: La cara oculta
 2011: El sexo débil (TV series)
 2012: Operation E
 2013: Homeland (TV series, 1 episode)
 2014: ABCs of Death 2
 2016: Narcos (TV series, 5 episodes)
 2016: Backseat Fighter

References

External links
 Official website
 

20th-century Colombian actresses
1981 births
Living people
Actresses from Bogotá
21st-century Colombian actresses
Colombian female models
Colombian film actresses
Colombian telenovela actresses